The 1973 All-SEC football team consists of American football players selected to the All-Southeastern Conference (SEC) chosen by various selectors for the 1973 NCAA Division I football season. Alabama won the conference.

Offensive selections

Receivers 
 Wayne Wheeler, Alabama (AP-1, UPI)
 Lee McGriff, Florida (AP-2)

Tight ends 
Butch Veazey, Ole Miss (AP-2, UPI)
Brad Boyd, LSU (AP-1)

Tackles 
Art Bressler, Ole Miss (AP-1, UPI)
Mac McWhorter, Georgia (AP-1)
Steve Sprayberry, Alabama (UPI)
Harvey Sword, Kentucky (AP-2)
Richard Brooks, LSU (AP-2)

Guards 
Buddy Brown, Alabama (AP-1, UPI)
Tyler Lafauci, LSU (AP-1, UPI)
Lee Gross, Auburn (AP-2)
Burton Lawless, Florida (AP-2)

Centers 
Steve Taylor, Auburn (AP-1, UPI)
 Jimmy Ray Stephens, Florida (AP-2)

Quarterbacks 

 Condredge Holloway, Tennessee (AP-1, UPI)
Gary Rutledge, Alabama (AP-2)

Running backs 
 Sonny Collins, Kentucky (AP-1, UPI)
 Wilbur Jackson, Alabama (AP-1, UPI)
 Brad Davis, LSU (AP-2, UPI)
 Wayne Jones, Miss. St. (AP-1)
Haskel Stanback, Tennessee (AP-2)
Steve Bisceglia, Alabama (AP-2)

Defensive selections

Ends 
Jimmy Webb, Miss. St. (AP-2, UPI)
Ricky Browne, Florida (AP-1)
 Binks Miciotto, LSU (AP-1)
 Jim McCollum, Kentucky (UPI)
Mike DuBose, Alabama (AP-2)

Tackles 
Benny Sivley, Auburn (AP-1, UPI)
Ben Williams, Ole Miss (AP-2, UPI)
Mike Raines, Alabama (AP-1)
David Hitchcock, Florida (AP-2)

Linebackers 
Warren Capone, LSU (AP-1, UPI)
Woody Lowe, Alabama (AP-1, UPI)
Ralph Ortega, Florida (AP-1, UPI)
Jim Stuart, Ole Miss (AP-2)
Ken Bernich, Auburn (AP-2)
Bo Harris, LSU (AP-2)

Backs 
Eddie Brown, Tennessee (AP-1, UPI)
Darryl Bishop, Kentucky (AP-2, UPI)
Mike Washington, Alabama (AP-1)
Jim Reveis, Florida (AP-1)
David Langner, Auburn (UPI)
David McMakin, Alabama (UPI)
Harry Harrison, Ole Miss (AP-2)
Mike Williams, LSU (AP-2)

Special teams

Kicker 

 Hawkins Golden, Vanderbilt (AP-1)
Ricky Townsend, Tennessee (AP-2)

Punter 

Greg Gantt, Alabama (AP-1)
Neil Clabo, Tennessee (AP-2)

Return specialist
Mike Fuller, Auburn (AP-1)
Willie Shelby, Alabama (AP-2)

Key
AP = Associated Press

UPI = United Press International

Bold = Consensus first-team selection by both AP and UPI

See also
1973 College Football All-America Team

References

All-SEC
All-SEC football teams